Amelungsburg is the name of two Iron Age circular rampart sites in the Weser Uplands of Germany. The two sites are only 30 kilometres apart and are intervisible.

Amelungsburg (Süntel)
Amelungsburg (Lippe Uplands)